Lemmings is the first studio album by British progressive rock group Bachdenkel. Conceived as a three sided album it was recorded during the summer of 1970 after the group relocated to France, but would not be released for nearly three years, in 1973 by which time it had used up over 12,000 pounds of unpaid studio time (the equivalent to over £129,000 in 2022). Despite interest in the UK from CBS and Warner Brothers in 1973 studio owners Europa Sonor struck a deal with Philips in France who would release it as a two sided album. In 1978 it was released with 3 missing tracks on an enclosed EP by the Initial Recording Company that was created by Karel Beer.

Track listing

Side one
 "Translation" 4:17
 "Equals" 1:51
 "An Appointment With The Master" 5:15
 "The Settlement Song" 11:26

Side two
 "Long Time Living" 2:17
 "Strangerstill" 6:51
 "Come All Ye Faceless" 9:06

2007 Ork reissue with bonus tracks
 "The Slightest Distance" - 6:09 - From Lemmings EP originally released in 1978.
 "Donna" 4:15 - From Lemmings EP originally released in 1978.
 "A Thousand Pages Before" 6:35 - From Lemmings EP originally released in 1978.
 "Through The Eyes of a Child" 4:01 - Unreleased 1969 single.
 "An (other) Appointment With The Master" 3:42 - 1973 single version.
 "Strange People" 3:20 - Unreleased 1968 single, as "U Know Who".

Personnel (original album)
 Peter Kimberley: Six-string bass guitar, piano on "Equals", vocals
 Colin Swinburne: (1948 - 2021) Guitar, organ, piano, vocals
 Brian Smith: Drums, percussion
 Karel Beer: Organ on "Come All Ye Faceless"

References
www.anythingmatters.com/bachdenkel

1973 debut albums
Self-released albums
Bachdenkel albums